

Games by company
 List of Atari, Inc. games (1972–1984), games developed or published by the original Atari, Inc.
 List of Atari, Inc. games (1993–present), games developed or published by Atari, Inc. (Atari, SA subsidiary) (1993–present)

Other Atari companies without separate lists
 Atari Corporation, developer and publisher of personal computers and consoles (1984–96)
 Atari Games, developer of arcade games (1984–99)

Games by Atari platform
 List of Atari arcade games
 List of Atari 2600 games
 List of Atari 5200 games
 List of Atari 7800 games
 List of Atari ST games
 List of Atari XEGS games
 List of Atari Lynx games
 List of Atari Jaguar games
 Atari Jaguar CD#Jaguar CD-ROM games
 Atari Flashback#Included games